Southern Midlands is a local government body in Tasmania, covering the southern region of the Tasmanian central midlands. Southern Midlands is classified as a rural local government area and has a population of 6,118, the major localities of the region include Campania, Kempton, Mangalore and the principal town of Oatlands.

History and attributes
On 2 April 1993, Oatlands and Green Ponds were amalgamated with parts of the municipalities of Brighton and Richmond to form the new Southern Midlands Council. Southern Midlands is classified as rural, agricultural and large (RAL) under the Australian Classification of Local Governments.

Localities

See also
List of local government areas of Tasmania

References

External links

Southern Midlands Council official website
Local Government Association Tasmania
Tasmanian Electoral Commission - local government

 
Local government areas of Tasmania